Nephopterix is a genus of moths of the family Pyralidae erected by Jacob Hübner in 1825.

Species
Nephopterix albovariegata Rothschild, 1915
Nephopterix angustella (Hübner, 1796)
Nephopterix ardesiifascia Rothschild, 1915
Nephopterix bicolorella Leech, 1889
Nephopterix capnoessa (Turner, 1904)
Nephopterix cleopatrella Ragonot, 1887
Nephopterix chryserythra (Lower, 1902)
Nephopterix cometella de Joannis, 1927
Nephopterix concineratella Ragonot, 1887
Nephopterix furella (Strand 1918)
Nephopterix fuscalis (Kenrick, 1907)
Nephopterix griseola Rothschild, 1915
Nephopterix habrostola (Lower, 1905)
Nephopterix hajastanica Harutiunian, 1989
Nephopterix hastiferella Ragonot, 1887
Nephopterix hemibaphes (Turner, 1905)
Nephopterix kuznetzovi Harutiunian in Harutiunian, 1989
Nephopterix lateritialis Walker, 1863
Nephopterix melanostyla (Meyrick, 1879)
Nephopterix nocticolorella Ragonot, 1887
Nephopterix obscuribasella Ragonot, 1887
Nephopterix piratis (Meyrick, 1887)
Nephopterix placoxantha (Lower, 1898)
Nephopterix scabida Zeller, 1867
Nephopterix thermalopha (Lower, 1903)

References

Phycitini
Pyralidae genera